Emily Westwood may refer to:

 Emily Westwood (footballer)
 Emily Westwood (badminton)